Agenda Europe is a European organization whose main goals include opposing rights for LGBT people and promoting conservative extremist positions.

Agenda Europa was created in 2013 based on strict criteria of secrecy. Its specifics were only revealed in 2017 when multiple documents emerged regarding the project's operations, participants, goals, and funding.

History

Beginning 
Agenda Europa was created in January 2013 out of a meeting that took place in London involving, approximately, 20 North American and European anti-abortion leaders and strategic advisors who aimed to "develop a Christian-inspired European think tank" and "devise new strategies for European anti-abortion movements."

Organized jointly by the Austrian conservative and Catholic activist Gudrun Kugler and the American Terrence McKeegan the London retreat was to be "strictly confidential". Documents later unearthed stated that "this program should not be forwarded for any reason without the permission of the organizers."

In the early days of Agenda Europe Peadar O'Scolai from the Irish organization Family & Life, asked participants to identify "achievable goals for the pro-life movement," while Gudrun Kugler dedicated herself to "developing a pan-European think tank to reflect Christian values" noting that "there is no Christian-inspired think tank in Europe to analyze current trends, to develop responses, arguments, alternatives, and to define languages. Such complex topics are left to non-governmental organizations or a few legislators to solve on their own."

Development 
In 2013, an anonymous blog titled "Agenda Europe" appeared, covering news and developments in European politics while harshly criticizing any legal and political progress in the area of human rights regarding sexuality and reproduction. The blog quickly became a focal point for traditionalist perspectives in this arena and rose to the headlines for its extremist positions.

In the summer of 2017, some documents regarding the organization became public knowledge thanks to Franco-German Arte Television. These documents included details of the aforementioned founding meeting that took place in 2013, the name chosen for the organizational center, the subsequent yearly meetings of the board, a list of social networking experts with whom the group intended to act on the internet, and the common manifesto for the Agenda Europa network entitled "Restoring the Natural Order: an Agenda for Europe."

Participants 
The leaked documents mentioned above revealed that up to that point, Agenda Europa's board numbered about 100-150 individuals (including many political leaders and government officials from across Europe) and at least 50 conservative organizations.

The organization can also count on the support of some senior Catholic prelates; an example can be seen at the 2014 annual conference when properties used for spiritual retreats were given to participants by the Archdiocese of Munich.

Financing 
In order to operate, the group can count on numerous funds from organizations belonging to: billionaires, aristocrats and oligarchs. Among the highest-ranking names are:[1]
 Patrick Slim Domit, son of multi-billionaire Carlos Slim Helú is one of the biggest funders of anti-abortion movements in Mexico and around the world.
 Archduke Imre and his wife, Archduchess Kathleen, representing the Habsburg-Lorraine family (Austria's last imperial family), who have lent their patronage to many of the group's initiatives (the family's wealth is between $63 million and $207 million).
 Oliver Hylton, who was the wealth manager of financier Sir Michel Hintze (a tycoon with assets of $2.6 billion known in the news for his funding of propaganda groups related to global warming denialism).
 Alexey Komov, representative of the Russian Orthodox Church, is sponsored by the far-right multimillionaire oligarch Konstantin Malofeev, was in charge of the foundation's international projects.

Strategy 
To undertake its goals the group acts through: political lobbying, referendum campaigns, petitions and disinformation actions.

To more effectively convey their demands against secularization and cultural revolutions far from their positions, the organization aims to: impute to those who support instances diametrically opposed to theirs that they are discriminating and intolerant towards Christians or that they are Christianophobic by portraying themselves as victims, bring their proposals under the name of "rights" and not "restrictions" or "prohibitions", label their opponents as violent and themselves as "anti-system" trying to become respectable interlocutors at the international level.

Operation 
The group has drafted many campaigns to influence legislation in different countries and some of the most important include:
 The petition and referendum to ban egalitarian marriage in the Croatian constitution (2013; successful)
 A bill to limit the right to abortion in Spain (2014; failure: revoked in September 2014)
 The petition and referendum to restrict same-sex marriage in Slovenia (2015; successful)
 The complaint against Sweden for failure to respect conscientious objection in the area of reproductive health (2015-2017; failure: all requests rejected)
 The referendum to restrict same-sex marriage in Slovakia (2015; failure: quorum not reached)
 A Polish bill to ban abortion with prison sentences for women (2016; failure: rejected by Parliament in October 2016)
 A "Mom, Dad & Kids" initiative to define marriage in Europe as only "between a man and a woman" (2016; failure: insufficient signatures collected)
 Political lobbying against the ratification of the Istanbul Convention for Bulgaria, Croatia, Poland (2016-2018; success in Bulgaria and failure in Croatia and Poland)
 Petition and referendum to ban egalitarian marriage in Romania (2016-2018; success: 3 million signatures collected; failure: quorum not reached)

Yearly meetings 
The program of the meetings follows a set formula: participants are offered a reception at which an opening speech is made usually by a politician such as Jakob Cornides, then administrator of the European Commission, or Rocco Buttiglione, then an Italian member of parliament, or Aleksander Stępkowski, then deputy foreign minister of Poland. This is followed by a Mass celebration and a two-day seminar with a format that varies from plenary presentations to the creation of thematic working groups related to the group's instances and progress.

References 

Anti-abortion organizations
Opposition to same-sex marriage